Carmel is a town in Penobscot County, Maine, United States. It is part of the Bangor Metropolitan Statistical Area. The population was 2,867 at the 2020 census.

Geography
The center of town is located at the intersection of U.S. Route 2 and Maine State Route 100 with Maine State Route 69. Interstate 95 passes east–west through the southern portion of town, with access via exits 167 and 174, both outside the town boundary.

Souadabscook Stream is the main waterway through the town, flowing east to the Penobscot River in Hampden.

History
Martin Kinsley of Hampden bought this township in 1795 and began selling lots. The first settlers were Abel Ruggles and the Rev. Paul Ruggles, who named the place to honor the prophet Elijah's experience on Mount Carmel. It was incorporated as a town in 1811.

Notable people 

 Myrna Fahey (1933–1973), actress
 Amory Nelson Hardy, photographer
 Emory A. Hebard, Member of the Vermont House of Representatives from 1961 to 1977, Vermont State Treasurer from 1977 to 1989

Demographics

2010 census
As of the census of 2010, there were 2,794 people, 1,097 households, and 818 families living in the town. The racial makeup of the town was 97.6% White, 0.5% African American, 0.5% Native American, 0.2% Asian, 0.3% from other races, and 0.9% from two or more races. Hispanic or Latino of any race were 0.8% of the population.

There were 1,097 households, of which 34.5% had children under the age of 18 living with them, 59.5% were married couples living together, 9.3% had a female householder with no husband present, 5.7% had a male householder with no wife present, and 25.4% were non-families. 19.4% of all households were made up of individuals, and 7% had someone living alone who was 65 years of age or older. The average household size was 2.55 and the average family size was 2.90.

The median age in the town was 40.5 years. 23% of residents were under the age of 18; 7.1% were between the ages of 18 and 24; 26.3% were from 25 to 44; 30.6% were from 45 to 64; and 13% were 65 years of age or older. The gender makeup of the town was 50.3% male and 49.7% female.

2000 census
As of the census of 2000, there were 2,416 people, 932 households, and 707 families living in the town. The racial makeup of the town was 98.18% White, 0.17% African American, 0.29% Native American, 0.37% Asian, 0.08% from other races, and 0.91% from two or more races. Hispanic or Latino of any race were 0.33% of the population.

There were 932 households, out of which 37.7% had children under the age of 18 living with them, 62.6% were married couples living together, 8.5% had a female householder with no husband present, and 24.1% were non-families. 16.4% of all households were made up of individuals, and 6.2% had someone living alone who was 65 years of age or older.  The average household size was 2.59 and the average family size was 2.89.

In the town, the population was spread out, with 26.0% under the age of 18, 6.6% from 18 to 24, 32.9% from 25 to 44, 24.9% from 45 to 64, and 9.6% who were 65 years of age or older.  The median age was 38 years. For every 100 females, there were 101.5 males.  For every 100 females age 18 and over, there were 95.4 males.

The median income for a household in the town was $37,645, and the median income for a family was $41,474. Males had a median income of $31,354 versus $21,176 for females. The per capita income for the town was $15,597.  About 9.8% of families and 11.4% of the population were below the poverty line, including 13.8% of those under age 18 and 16.2% of those age 65 or over.

References

External links
Town of Carmel official website

Towns in Penobscot County, Maine
Towns in Maine